Samson Kandie (born April 20, 1971) is a retired male long-distance runner from Kenya, who won the 2004 edition of the Vienna Marathon. He set his personal best (2:08:31) in the classic distance on September 26, 1999, at the Berlin Marathon, where he finished third. He was third in the Berlin marathon also in 1998.

He also took part the marathon race at the 2001 World Championships, but did not finish the race.

Achievements

External links

Marathoninfo profile

1971 births
Living people
Kenyan male long-distance runners
20th-century Kenyan people
21st-century Kenyan people